Aleksandra Dmitriyevna Maksakova (born 25 July 1997) is a Russian dressage rider. She competed at the European Championships for Juniors, Young Riders and U25 from 2014 through 2020. Maksakova competed for the Russian dressage team at the Tokyo 2020 Olympic Games.

In 2013, Maksakova came as a 15-year-old to the Netherlands to train with three-time Olympic gold medalist Anky van Grunsven. In 2016, she moved to Belgium to train with Wim Verwimp, but decided to go back to Russia in 2017.

References

External links
 

1997 births
Living people
Russian female equestrians
Russian dressage riders
Equestrians at the 2020 Summer Olympics
Olympic equestrians of Russia